NetQuote is an American insurance lead provider for insurance agents. The online insurance quote marketplace allows consumers to apply and comparison-shop for quotes, from a variety of major providers of auto, home, health, life and business insurance.

NetQuote does not directly provide insurance. It connects customers with insurance agents via its matching system. The information is then sold to insurance brokers. Customers are contacted by agents after the application process, at which point they can select from the interested providers.

History
NetQuote was founded in 1989 when Keith Lawton, an insurance agent, and Harvey Lawton, a software engineer, created the world's first interactive voice-response service to shop for insurance. It was named Telerate, Inc.

In 1993, Telerate joined forces with Auto Insurance Shopper to create a single company, using the latter's name. Later, the company launched its Internet platform and rebranded itself as NetQuote.  
NetQuote was acquired by Spectrum Equity Investors and Stripes Group in 2005. Columbus Day 2020 acquired NetQuote in 2010. All Web Leads acquired NetQuote in 2015.

Awards and recognition
In June 2008, InsureMe was named a finalist for the third annual Best Companies to Work For in Colorado, a competition run by the Society for Human Resource Management (SHRM) Colorado State Council.

References

Insurance companies of the United States
Online insurance companies
Companies based in Denver
Bankrate
2005 mergers and acquisitions
2010 mergers and acquisitions
Financial services companies established in 1989